The 2013 BWF Super Series Finals was a top level badminton competition which was held from December 11 to December 15, 2013 in Kuala Lumpur, Malaysia. The final was held by Badminton Association of Malaysia and sponsored by Malaysia. It was the final event of the BWF Super Series competition on the 2013 BWF Super Series schedule. The total purse for the event was $500,000.

Representatives by nation

§: Christinna Pedersen from Denmark, Pia Zebadiah Bernadeth from Indonesia and Ma Jin from China were the players who played in two categories (women's doubles and mixed doubles).

Performance by nation

Men's singles

Seeds

Alternates

Group A

Group B

Finals

Women's singles

Seeds

Alternates

Group A

Group B

Finals

Men's doubles

Seeds

Alternates
  Chris Adcock / Andrew Ellis

Group A

Group B

Finals

Women's doubles

Seeds

Alternates

Group A

Group B

Finals

Mixed doubles

Seeds

Alternates

Group A

Group B

Finals

References

External links
BWF Super Series Masters Finals 2013 at tournamentsoftware.com

BWF Super Series Masters Finals
Masters Finals
Badminton tournaments in Malaysia
International sports competitions hosted by Malaysia
BWF Super Series Finals